(formerly written as Hakodadi) is a city and port located in Oshima Subprefecture, Hokkaido, Japan. It is the capital city of Oshima Subprefecture. As of July 31, 2011, the city has an estimated population of 279,851 with 143,221 households, and a population density of 412.83 persons per km2 (1,069.2 persons per sq. mi.). The city is the third biggest in Hokkaido after Sapporo and Asahikawa.

History
Hakodate was Japan's first city whose port was opened to foreign trade in 1854, as a result of Convention of Kanagawa, and used to be the most important port in northern Japan. Also, the city had been the biggest city in Hokkaido before the Great Hakodate Fire of 1934.

Pre-Meiji restoration
Hakodate (like much of other parts of Hokkaido), was originally populated by the Ainu. They lived in the Oshima Peninsula. The name "Hakodate" may have originated from an Ainu word, "hak-casi" ("shallow fort"). Another possibility is that it means "box" or "building" in Japanese which refers to the castle built by the Kono (Kano) clan in the fifteenth century.

Hakodate was founded in 1454, when Kono Kaganokami Masamichi constructed a large manor house in the Ainu fishing village of Usukeshi (the word for bay in Ainu).

After his death, Masamichi's son, Kono Suemichi, and family were driven out of Hakodate into nearby Kameda during the Ainu rebellion in 1512 and little history was recorded for the area during the next 100 years. There was constant low-level conflict in the Oshima peninsula at the time with the Ainu, as armed merchants like the Kono family, established bases to control trade in the region. This conflict culminated in an uprising from 1669 to 1672, led by Ainu warrior Shakushain after which the Ainu in the region were suppressed.

Hakodate flourished during the Hoei period (1704–11), and many new temples were founded in the area. The town's fortunes received a further boost in 1741 when the Matsumae clan, which had been granted nearby areas on the Oshima Peninsula as a march fief, moved its Kameda magistracy to Masamichi's house in Hakodate.

In 1779, the Tokugawa shogunate took direct control over Hakodate, which triggered rapid development in the area. Merchant Takadaya Kahei, who is honoured as the founder of Hakodate port, set up trading operations, which included opening the northern Etorofu sea route to the Kuril island fisheries. He is credited with turning Hakodate from a trading outpost into a thriving city. A Hakodate magistracy was established in 1802. By 1807, the power of the Tokugawa government extended to the entire region. However, in 1821, the central government relaxed their control of the area and restored the Matsumae clan to the full powers they had before.

Meiji restoration
The port of Hakodate was surveyed by a fleet of five U.S. ships in 1854 under the conditions of the Convention of Kanagawa, as negotiated by Commodore Matthew Perry.

Hakodate port partially opened to foreign ships for provisioning in the following year and then completely to foreign trade on 2 June 1859 as one of five Japanese open ports designated in the 1858 Treaty of Amity and Commerce signed with the U.S. The Hakodate foreign settlement is one of the legacies of foreign influence in Hakodate.

A mariner in Perry's fleet died during a visit to the area and became the first U.S. citizen to be buried in Japan when he was interred in Hakodate's cemetery for foreigners.

British merchant, naturalist and spy, Thomas Blakiston, took up residence in Hakodate in the summer of 1861 to establish a saw milling business. He stayed in Hakodate until 1884, during which time he documented the local natural environment, equipped the local meteorological station and ran guns to the Boshin War rebels.

As one of few points of Japanese contact with the outside world, Hakodate was soon host to several overseas consulates. The Russian consulate included a chapel from where Nicholas of Japan is credited with introducing Eastern Orthodox Christianity to Japan in 1861 (now the Japanese Orthodox Church). The Orthodox church is neighbored by several other historical missionary churches, including Anglican and Catholic.

Hakodate also played a central role in the Boshin War between the Tokugawa shogunate and the Meiji Emperor which followed Perry's opening of Japan. Shogunate rebel Enomoto Takeaki fled to Hakodate with the remnants of his navy and his handful of French advisers in winter 1868, including Jules Brunet. They formally established the Republic of Ezo on December 25. The republic tried unsuccessfully to gather international recognition to foreign legations in Hakodate, including the Americans, French, and Russians. The Naval Battle of Hakodate was fought from 4 to 10 May 1869, between the remnants of the Tokugawa shogunate navy and the newly formed Imperial Japanese Navy. It was a decisive victory for the Imperial Japanese Navy.

On 14 June 1868, Hakodate was designated as an urban prefecture (府 fu), one of the first two, the other being Kyoto. On February 8, 1882, it was enlarged into Hakodate-ken, and then became part of Hokkaido on January 26, 1886.

The rebels occupied Hakodate's famous European-style Goryōkaku fort and used it as the centre of their defences in southern Hokkaido. Government forces defeated the secessionists in the Battle of Hakodate in 1869 and the city and fort were surrendered to emperor. Military leader, Hijikata Toshizō, was one of those slain in the fighting.

In 1878, Isabella Bird reported of the city in her travelogue: 
The streets are very wide and clean, but the houses are mean and low. The city looks as if it had just recovered from a conflagration. The houses are nothing but tinder… Stones, however, are its prominent feature. Looking down upon it from above you see miles of grey boulders, and realise that every roof in the windy capital is "hodden doun" by a weight of paving stones.

20th century to present day

Hakodate was awarded city status on August 1, 1922. On March 21, 1934, a serious fire had destroyed around two-thirds of all the buildings in Hakodate. This event also led to many residents leaving and subsequently depopulating the city. The city escaped most of the ravages of World War II. Areas around Hakodate-yama were fortified and access restricted to the public. Many prisoners of war were interned in Hakodate and historians record a total of 10 camps. The city was subjected to two Allied bombing raids on 14 and 15 July 1945. Around 400 homes were destroyed on the western side of Hakodate-yama and an Aomori-Hakodate ferry was attacked with 400 passengers killed.

In 1976, a defecting Soviet pilot named Viktor Belenko flew his plane into the civilian airport in Hakodate.

Hakodate's size nearly doubled on December 1, 2004, when the town of Minamikayabe (from Kayabe District), and the towns of Esan and Toi, and the village of Todohokke (all from Kameda District), were merged into it.

The Hokkaido Shinkansen line opened on 26 March 2016. The undersea Seikan Tunnel with the Shinkansen rail line greatly reduced the travel time from Honshu to Hakodate.

Geography

Mount Hakodate was originally an island that was formed by volcanic eruptions millions of years ago. During the course of history a sand bar formed between Mount Hakodate and the peninsula. This landform, which is an example of a tombolo, finished forming in circa 1000 BCE. The tombolo connects the former Hakodate island with the main island Hokkaido to the north. The main central area of Hakodate city is located on the sandbar.

Hakodate is located at the center of Kameda Peninsula. The city is overlooked by Mount Hakodate. The summit can be reached by hiking trail, cable car, or by car. Visitors can also reach the peak of Mount Hakodate by taking tour bus and/or direct bus. that departs from JR Hakodate Station. An obscure local nickname of the bumpy mountain is Gagyūzan (Mount Cow's Back), alluding to the way the mountain resembles a resting cow.

The former Goryōkaku fort is now used in as a public park and is popular in Hokkaido for hanami (cherry blossom viewing). Since April 2006, the park has also featured the tall, white Goryōkaku Tower. Resembling an air traffic control tower, the structure offers a panoramic view of the park, including mainland Japan across the Tsugaru Strait on clear days.

Nearby cities and towns
 Hokuto to the west
 Nanae to the north
 Shikabe to the north east

Mountains

 Mount E: Hokkaido's southernmost volcano
 Mount Hakodate

Rivers

Cityscape
Hakodate has a cityscape that covers the center of the Kameda peninsula. A narrow land area separates Hakodate Bay to the west from Tsugaru Strait in the south-east side. It is best viewed from the top of Mount Hakodate.

Demographics
The population of Hakodate increased by 402% from 28,825 to 144,749 between 1873 till 1920. Hakodate's population peaked in 1980 at 320,154, but has been gradually in decline due to aging since then.

Climate
According to the Köppen climate classification, Hakodate's climate is humid continental (Dfb) of warm summer and winters with regular intense blizzards. With an alternate definition, using the  isotherm, Hakodate falls in the rare oceanic climate (Cfb) of the east coast of the continents due to the warm current of Tsushima. And so the city is the limit of hot summer climates for a city on the immediate coast in Japan (Cfa/Dfa), although appearing in other interior regions of the province. Hakodate has snowy winters and warm, humid summers. Winters are cold for the latitude but milder than much of Hokkaido.

Hakodate features four distinct seasons. Spring typically begins with some snowfall, but sees a gradual warming trend as the season progress. Fall initially is warm but becomes increasingly colder as the season progress. It is not uncommon to see snowfall in the latter parts of the fall season.

Economy
Prior to its dissolution, Air Hokkaido was headquartered in Hakodate. In January 2006, the regional airline Airtransse was headquartered in Hakodate.

Culture and landmarks

In Funami-cho stands the Koryu-ji temple. It's the oldest Buddhist temple (affiliated with the Soto school) in the region which was built in 1633. It was badly damaged during the Boshin War and moved to its current location in 1879. The existing main building was built in 1900.

The city is well known for seafood and sushi. Hakodate shio ramen is also a famous speciality of the city. Shio (salt) ramen has a pale, clear, broth made with plenty of salt and any combination of chicken, pork bone, vegetables, fish, and seaweed. On a similar note, Hakodate's city fish is the squid. Hakodate is famous for the restaurant Ikkatei Tabiji, which serves a dish called "dancing squid": - a recently deceased squid is served with soy sauce, the sodium of which causes a cadaveric spasm when poured over the squid.

Every year (August) the city gets together for the Hakodate Port Festival. Hordes of citizens gather in the streets to dance a wiggly dance known as the Ika-odori (Squid Dance), the name of which describes the dance appropriately. The glowing lights of squid-catching boats can be seen in the waters surrounding the city. The bell of Haristos Orthodox Church is one of the 100 Soundscapes of Japan.

The Hakodate Fish Market (otherwise known as the Ashaichi or Morning Market) is a 10-minute walk from the JR Hakodate Station. It is open daily and boasts hundreds of fish and sea food stands in addition to restaurants. Popular fares include sea urchin and calamari, the famous Japanese snow crab from the famous Hokkaido waters.

 Hakodate Hachiman Shrine
 Mt. Hakodate Ropeway
 Hakodate City Museum
 Hakodate City Museum of Literature
 Hakodate City Museum of Northern Peoples
 Hakodate Museum of Art, Hokkaido
 Hakodate Jōmon Culture Center
 Hakodate Park
 Shinori-date
 Shiryōkaku
 Virgin of the Angel Trappistine Monastery

Transportation

Hakodate Transportation Bureau operates tram (Light rail) lines.

The Hokkaido Shinkansen opened in March 2016. It currently runs to Shin-Hakodate-Hokuto Station through the Seikan Tunnel from Shin-Aomori Station. There are plans to extend the Hokkaido Shinkansen north to Sapporo Station by 2030.
 JR Hokkaido station
 Hakodate Main Line : Hakodate Station - Goryōkaku Station - Kikyō Station
 South Hokkaido Railway Company : Goryōkaku Station
 Hakodate Airport
 Port of Hakodate
 Hokkaido Expressway

Education

Universities
National
 Hokkaido University, Hakodate Campus
 Hokkaido University of Education, Hakodate Campus
Public
 Future University Hakodate
Private
 Hakodate University
 Hakodate Junior College
 Hakodate Otani College
 Russia Kyokutou University Hakodate school

Colleges
National
 Hakodate National College of Technology

High schools

Public
 Hokkaido Hakodate Chubu High School
 Hokkaido Hakodate Nishi High School
 Hokkaido Hakodate Ryohoku High School
 Hokkaido Hakodate Technical High School
 Hokkaido Hakodate Commercial High School
 Hokkaido Minamikayabe High School
 Hokkaido Toi High School
 Hakodate City High School

Private
 Hakodate La Salle Junior High School & Senior High School
 Hakodate Shirayuri Gakuen Junior High School & Senior High School
 Hakodate Otani High School
 Iai Joshi Women's Academy
 Otsuma High School
 Seisho Gakuin High School
 Hakuryo High School affiliated with Hakodate University
 Yuto High School affiliated with Hakodate University

Sister cities
  Halifax, Nova Scotia, Canada (since 1982)
  Vladivostok, Primorsky Krai, Russia (since 1992)
  City of Lake Macquarie, New South Wales, Australia (since 1992)
  Yuzhno-Sakhalinsk, Sakhalin Oblast, Russia (since 1997)
  Singapore, since 1992 (Treaty of Friendship)
  Tianjin, China (since 2001)
  Goyang, Gyeonggi-do, South Korea (since 2011)

Notable people

 Kazuo Ohno, Butoh dancer
 Saburō Kitajima, singer
 Glay, rock/pop band
 Juran Hisao, mystery writer
 Kōhan Kawauchi, screenwriter
 Hidemi Kon, literary critic
 Naoko Matsui, voice actress
 Kogo Noda, screenwriter
 Hideko Takamine, actress
 Yuki, musician (Real Name: Yuki Kuramochi, Nihongo: 倉持 有希, Kuramochi Yuki)
 Great Kojika, Japanese professional wrestler, founder and chairman of Big Japan Pro Wrestling (Real Name: Shinya Koshika, Nihongo: 小鹿 信也, Koshika Shinya)
 Menso-re Oyaji, Japanese professional wrestler (Real Name: Yohei Nakajima, Nihongo: 中島洋平, Nakajima Yōhei)
 Gorô Naya, voice actor

References

External links

 Official Website

 
Populated places established in the 1450s
Cities in Hokkaido
Port settlements in Japan
Populated coastal places in Japan
Capitals of former nations
1454 establishments in Asia
1450s establishments in Japan